Robert Kazadi Mwamba (6 March 1947 – 1998) was a goalkeeper who played for TP Mazembe and Zaire.

Career 
Mwamba played for DR Congo giants TP Mazembe and the Zaire national team (now DR Congo).

He was named the Player of the Tournament when Congo won the 1968 African Cup of Nations and followed this up with another victory in the 1974 African Cup of Nations where he was named to the Team of the Tournament.

At the 1974 FIFA World Cup, in a group game involving the Leopards and Yugoslavia, Kazadi conceded three goals in the first 20 minutes and was substituted by his Yugoslavian coach, Blagoje Vidinić.

He appeared in two 1982 World Cup qualifying matches; a 5–2 win over Mozambique on 13 July 1980 and a 3–2 win over Madagascar on 21 December 1980.

Kazadi was voted the IFFHS Keeper of the Century for the Democratic Republic of the Congo in 2000.

He was the cousin of fellow footballer Bwanga Tshimen.

Honours 
TP Mazembe
 Linafoot: 1967, 1969, 1976
 Congo Cup: 1967, 1979
 African Cup of Champions Clubs: 1967, 1968
 African Cup Winners' Cup: 1980

Zaire

 African Cup of Nations: 1968, 1974

Individual

 Africa Cup of Nations Player of the Tournament: 1968

See also
1974 FIFA World Cup squads

References

External links

1947 births
1998 deaths
People from Lubumbashi
Africa Cup of Nations-winning players
Association football goalkeepers
Democratic Republic of the Congo footballers
Democratic Republic of the Congo international footballers
1974 FIFA World Cup players
1968 African Cup of Nations players
1970 African Cup of Nations players
1972 African Cup of Nations players
1974 African Cup of Nations players
TP Mazembe players